The Record (also known as The Troy Record) is a broadsheet daily newspaper once published in Troy, New York. The paper has been published regularly since 1896. It covers all of New York's Capital Region and specifically the city of Troy. On September 1, 2005, The Record changed from a traditional broadsheet layout to a tabloid format similar to that of certain big-city newspapers but subsequently changed back to its original format. The paper is owned by 21st Century Media. Its offices were located on Broadway in downtown Troy, until the paper shuttered its offices in early 2019. It is now mainly digital, though the print edition is still published.

The Record is the official newspaper of the City of Cohoes.

References

External links
The Troy Record Online

Troy, New York
Daily newspapers published in New York (state)
21st Century Media publications
Newspapers established in 1896
1896 establishments in New York (state)